Megachile simlaensis is a species of bee in the family Megachilidae. It was described by Cameron in 1909.

References

Simlaensis
Insects described in 1909